Gerrid Kendrix is an American businessman, accountant, and politician serving as a member of the Oklahoma House of Representatives from the 52nd district. Elected in November 2020, he assumed office on January 11, 2021.

Early life and education 
Kendrix was raised in Altus, Oklahoma. He earned a Bachelor of Science degree in accounting from Cameron University in 1991.

Career 
Since graduating from college, Kendrix has worked as a Certified Public Accountant. He is the owner of an independent accounting firm. Kendrix was elected to the Oklahoma House of Representatives in November 2020 and assumed office on January 11, 2021. He also serves as vice chair of the house Judiciary – Criminal Committee.

References 

Living people
American accountants
Republican Party members of the Oklahoma House of Representatives
People from Altus, Oklahoma
Cameron University alumni
Year of birth missing (living people)